Chebrolu is a village in West Godavari district of the Indian state of Andhra Pradesh. It is located in Unguturu mandal of Eluru revenue division. The nearest town is Tadepalligudem.The AH45 which runs from NH16 in Kolkata to NH48 in Bangalore passes by the village with beautiful Godavari canal on the other side .

Demographics 

 Census of India, Chebrolu village has population of 14216 of which 6984 are males while 7232 are females. Average Sex Ratio is 1036 which is higher than Andhra Pradesh state average of 993. Population of children with age 0-6 is 1440 which makes up 10.13% of total population of village.  Child Sex Ratio is 917, lower than Andhra Pradesh average of 939. Literacy rate of Chebrolu village was 72.52% compared to 67.02% of Andhra Pradesh.

Transportation 
Chebrolu has a railway station where passengers halt. Buses from Eluru, Dwaraka Tirumala and Tadepalligudem passes through the village.

Health facilities 
Chebrolu has primary health center with dedicated doctor and pharmacy. There is a private hospital and a government hospital.

Education 
There are 9 government primary schools, seven private primary schools, five government high schools, five private high schools, two government secondary schools, and two private secondary schools.  
There is a government arts/science degree college and a private vocational training school. Nearest engineering college and management colleges are located in Tadepalligudem. The nearest medical college, Divyangu Special School is in Eluru and Polytechnic college is in Tanuku. The nearest arbitrary educational center is in and around Ungutur.

Medical facilities

Government medical facility
There are two doctors and 8 paramedics in a basic health center in Chebrolu. There are no doctors in the two primary health sub-centers. There are four paramedical staff. One is a doctor in a veterinary clinic and three are paramedical. There are no doctors in a nomadic clinic. There are three paramedical staff. The Family Welfare Center is 5 to 10 km from the village.

Private medical facility
The village has 4 private medical facilities. There are two MBBS doctors, one doctor who has studied degrees other than MBBS, and one doctor who does not have a degree. There are two drugstores.

Drinking water
Protected drinking water is being supplied by taps in the village. Drinking water is available to the village by canal/water/ river and pond.

Sanitation
The village has an underground sewerage system. Sewage also flows through open drains. The sewage flows openly and through the sewers. The sewage is flowing directly into the aquifer. A complete sanitation scheme is being implemented in the village. There is no social toilet facility. There is no recycling system for the home. There is no social biogas production system. Garbage is disposed of on the streets.

Communication
This village has a local BSNL office. It also has a post office, internet cafe / public service center, private courier

Finance 
There are cooperative banks in Narayanapuram and State Bank of India ATMs in Narayanapuram and Kaikaram. Union Bank of India is in Unguturu.

Recreation 
Nearest movie theatres are in Ganapavaram, Tadepalligudem and Eluru.

Electricity
The village has a power supply for household needs. Electricity is supplied for 7 hours a day for agriculture and 18 hours for commercial purposes.

Land use
Land use in Chebrole is as follows:
 Land under non-agricultural use – 189 hectares
 Irrigable and barren land – 26 hectares
 Permanent pastures, other grazing land – 30 hectares
 Gardens, etc. Extent of land – 22 hectares
 Non-cultivated lands – 24 hectares
 Wasteland – 447 hectares
 Sown land – 883 hectares
 Waterless land – 853 hectares
 Irrigated land from various sources – 501 hectares

Irrigation facilities
The supply of water to agriculture in Chebrolu is being carried out by
•	Canals: 475 hectares
•	Wells / Borewells: 26 hectares

Economy
The following items are produced in Chebrolu.

Main crops
Paddy and sugarcane

Industrial products
There is Johnson tiles ceramic factory in the village
Rice and ceramic objects

References

Villages in West Godavari district